Michael Goldsmith (born 1959) is a British computer scientist, senior research fellow and Lecturer at the University of Oxford, England.
He is a member of Oxford University's Department of Computer Science. He is an associate director of Oxford University's Cyber Security Centre, and an Oxford Martin Fellow of The Global Cyber Security Capacity Centre. He is a fellow of Worcester College, Oxford.

Career 
Goldsmith is a senior research fellow at the University of Oxford's Computer Science Department, From 2006 to 2011 he was principal fellow: High-Integrity Techniques in the e-Security Group of the WMG Digital Laboratory in the University of Warwick.

Publications 
Goldsmith's publications cover security, cryptography in general, CSP, and formal methods in particular.

References

External links 
 

1959 births
Living people
Alumni of the University of Oxford
British computer scientists
Members of the Department of Computer Science, University of Oxford
Fellows of Worcester College, Oxford
Formal methods people
Place of birth missing (living people)